Vigeland is a village in Lindesnes municipality in Agder county, Norway. Prior to 1 January 2020, the village was the administrative center of Lindesnes municipality.

Name
The village of Vigeland was named for the historic Vigeland farm which was located where the village is now. The farm was first documented in 1390 (Vikinggaland, meaning "Viking land"). The first element is the genitive case of the Old Norse personal name  meaning  "land owned by (the man) Víkingi". The first element could also be the genitive plural case of the Old Norse word víkingr meaning "Viking"  but the use of such a name would be a bit obscure.

Valle Church

Valle Church is located on the east side of the Audna river at Vigeland. It is the church for the Valle parish which covers the northeastern half of the municipality. The church has a cruciform shape and was built in 1793. It was internally restored for its 200th anniversary in 1993. A statue created by Gustav Vigeland of Peder Claussøn Friis, who was once a priest in Lindesnes, stands outside the Valle Church rectory.

Media gallery

Notable residents
The family of the artist Gustav Vigeland and his brother Emanuel both originally came from Vigeland. The brothers both lived for a time with their grandparents on a farm called Mjunebrokka in Vigeland. Both of Gustav Vigeland's parents were buried in the Valle Church cemetery.

References

Villages in Agder
Lindesnes